SPIRE1 is a protein that interacts with actin monomers and actin nucleating formin proteins. SPIRE1 was first identified in Drosophila melanogaster. SPIRE1 contains an N-terminal KIND domain which binds formins and four actin-binding WH2 domains which nucleate actin filaments.

References 

Proteins